The Ministry of Finance Football Club is a professional football club based in Putrajaya, Malaysia. They currently play in the third-tier division in Malaysian football, the Malaysia FAM League.

The football team is managed under the sports and recreational club of Malaysian Ministry of Finance, the Khazanah Treasury Club.

Players

First team squad

Transfers
For recent transfers, see List of Malaysian football transfers 2018 and List of Malaysian football transfers summer 2016

Team officials

Managers
Manager by years (2014–present)

Head coaches
Head coach by years (2013–present)

References

External links
 Kelab Khazanah Perbendaharaan Official Facebook Page
 MOF FC Official Facebook Page

Malaysia FAM League clubs
Football clubs in Malaysia
Ministry of Finance (Malaysia)
Financial services association football clubs in Malaysia